Agnès Tchuinté (30 January 1959 – 1990) was a Cameroonian athlete. She competed in the women's javelin throw at the 1980 Summer Olympics and the 1984 Summer Olympics.

References

1959 births
1990 deaths
Athletes (track and field) at the 1980 Summer Olympics
Athletes (track and field) at the 1984 Summer Olympics
Cameroonian female javelin throwers
Olympic athletes of Cameroon
Place of birth missing
Olympic female javelin throwers
African Games medalists in athletics (track and field)
African Games silver medalists for Cameroon
Athletes (track and field) at the 1978 All-Africa Games
20th-century Cameroonian women